This list of the Mesozoic life of Alabama contains the various prehistoric life-forms whose fossilized remains have been reported from within the US state of Alabama and are between 252.17 and 66 million years of age.

A

 Acirsa
 †Acirsa americana – or unidentified related form
 †Acirsa flexicostata
 †Acirsa implexa
 Acmaea
 †Acroscapellum
  †Acteon
 †Acteon cicatricosus
 †Acutostrea
 †Acutostrea plumosa
 †Aenona
 †Aenona eufalensis
 †Aenona eufaulensis
  †Agerostrea
 †Agerostrea mesenterica
 †Albertosaurus
  †Albula
 †Albula dunklei – type locality for species
 †Amaurellina
 †Amaurellina stephansoni
 †Amaurellina stephensoni
 †Ambigostrea
 †Ambigostrea tecticosta
  †Ampullina
 Amuletum
 †Anatimya
 †Anatimya anteradiata
 †Anchura
 †Anchura abrupta
 †Anchura noackensis
 †Ancilla
 †Ancilla acutula
 †Anisomyon
 †Anisomyon borealis – or unidentified related form
 †Anogmius
 †Anogmius polymicrodus – or unidentified comparable form
 †Anomalofusus
  †Anomia
 †Anomia argentaria
 †Anomia ornata
 †Anomia perlineata – or unidentified comparable form
 †Anomia preolmstedi
 †Anomia tellinoides
 †Anomoeodus
 †Anteglossia
 †Antibythocypris
 †Antibythocypris dimorphicus – type locality for species
 †Antibythocypris nephrotrema – type locality for species
 †Antillocaprina
 Antropora – tentative report
 †Antropora damicornis
 †Aphrodina
 †Aphrodina eufaulensis
 †Aphrodina tippana
   †Appalachiosaurus – type locality for genus
 †Appalachiosaurus montgomeriensis – type locality for species
 Arca
 †Arca martindalensis
 †Arca rostellata
  Architectonica
 †Arcoscalpellum
 †Arcoscalpellum hubricht
 †Arctostrea
 †Arctostrea aquilerae
 †Arctostrea falacata
 †Ariadnaesporites
 †Ariadnaesporites cristatus – type locality for species
 Arrhoges
 †Arrhoges plenacosta
 †Ascaulocardium
 †Ascaulocardium armatum
 †Aspidolithus
 †Aspidolithus parcus
 Astarte
 †Astarte culebrensis
 Ataphrus
 †Atreta
 †Atreta melleni
 †Avellana
  †Avitelmessus
 †Avitelmessus grapsoideus

B

  †Baculites
 †Baculites arculus
 †Baculites asper – or unidentified comparable form
 †Baculites capensis
 †Baculites tippahensis
  †Bananogmius
 †Bananogmius crieleyi – type locality for species
 †Bananogmius zitteli – or unidentified comparable form
 †Banis
 †Banis siniformis
 Barbatia
 †Bathytormus
 †Bathytormus pteropsis
  †Belemnitella
 †Belemnitella americana
 †Bellifusus
 †Bellifusus curvicostatus
 †Belliscala
 †Belemnitida
  †Belonostomus
 †Beretra
 †Beretra ripleyana
 †Bothremys
 Botula
 †Botula carolinensis
 †Botula conchafodentis
 †Botula ripleyana
 Brachidontes – tentative report
 †Brachycythere
 †Brachycythere asymmetrica – type locality for species
 Brachydontes – tentative report
 †Buccinopsis
 †Buccinopsis crassicostata
 †Buccinopsis solida
 †Bukyraster
 †Bukyraster hayi
 †Bulla – tentative report

C

 Cadulus
 †Cadulus obnutus
 Caestocorbula
 †Caestocorbula crassaplica
 †Caestocorbula crassiplica
 †Caestocorbula percompressa
 †Caestocorbula suffalciata
 †Caestocorbula terramaria
 †Calcarichelys – type locality for genus
 †Calcarichelys gemma – type locality for species
 †Calculites
 †Calculites ovalis
 Callianassa
 †Callianassa mortoni
 †Calliomphalus
 †Calliomphalus americanus
 †Calliomphalus nudus
 Calyptraea
 †Camptonectes
 †Camptonectes argillensis
 †Camptonectes bubonis
  Capulus
 †Capulus spangleri
 Cardium
 Caryocorbula – tentative report
 †Caryocorbula georgiana
 †Caryocorbula veatchi
 †Caveola
 †Ceriopora
 †Ceriopora vesiculosa
 Cerithiella
 †Cerithiella nodoliratum – or unidentified related form
 †Cerithiella semirugatum
 Cerithiopsis
  Cerithium
 †Cerithium weeksi – or unidentified related form
 Charonia
 †Chedighaii
  †Chelosphargis
 †Chelosphargis advena – or unidentified comparable form
 Chlamys
 †Chlamys mississippensis
 †Chlamys mississippiensis
  †Chondrites
  Cidaris
 †Cidaris wahalakensis
  †Cimolichthys
 †Cimolichthys nepaholica
 †Clarkiella
 †Clarkiella hemispherica
 Clavagella
 †Clavagella armata
 †Clavipholas
 †Clavipholas pectorosa
   †Clidastes
 †Clidastes intermedius
 †Clidastes liodontus
 †Clidastes propython – type locality for species
 Cliona
 †Cliona microtuberum
 †Clisocolus
 †Clisocolus concentricum
 †Coahuilites
 Corbula
 †Corbula subradiata
 †Corbula torta
 †Corsochelys – type locality for genus
 †Corsochelys haliniches – type locality for species
 Crassatella
 †Crassatella vadosa
  Crassostrea
 †Crassostrea cortex
 †Crenella
 †Crenella elegantula
 †Crenella senica
 †Crenella serica
 †Creonella
 †Creonella triplicata
 †Cretiscalpellum
 †Cretiscalpellum macrum
 †Cretiscalpellum venustum
 †Cretodus
 †Cretodus semiplicatus
  †Cretolamna
 †Cretolamna appendiculata
  †Cretoxyrhina
 †Cretoxyrhina mantelli
 Crucibulum
 Ctena
 †Ctena parvilineata
 Ctenochelys – type locality for genus
 †Ctenochelys acris – type locality for species
 †Ctenochelys tenuitesta – type locality for species
 †Cubitostera
 †Cubitostera tecticosta
  Cucullaea
 †Cucullaea capax
 †Cucullaea littlei
 †Cucullaea powersi – or unidentified comparable form
 †Cuna
 †Cuna texana
 Cuspidaria
 †Cuspidaria ampulla
 †Cuspidaria grandis
 †Cuspidaria grovensis
 †Cuspidaria jerseyensis – or unidentified comparable form
 †Cyclorisma
 †Cyclorisma parva
 Cylichna
 †Cylichna diversilirata
 †Cylichna incisa
 Cylichnella
 †Cylindrotruncatum
 †Cymbophora
 †Cymbophora appressa
 †Cymbophora berryi
 †Cymbophora cancellosa
 †Cymbophora lintea
 †Cymbophora wordeni
 †Cymella
 †Cymella bella
  Cypraea – report made of unidentified related form or using admittedly obsolete nomenclature
 †Cyprimeria
 †Cyprimeria alta
 †Cyprimeria depressa
 Cytherella
 †Cytherella tuberculifera

D

 Dasmosmilia
 †Dasmosmilia kochii
 †Dasmosmilia reesidi
  †Dentalium
 †Dentalium leve
 †Dentalium pauperculum
 †Dentalium ripleyana
 †Deussenia
 †Deussenia bellalirata
 †Dhondtichlamys
 †Dhondtichlamys venustus
 †Diplomoceras
 †Diplomoceras trabeatus
 †Discosaurus
 †Discosaurus vetustus
  †Discoscaphites
 †Discoscaphites conradi
 †Discoscaphites iris
 †Dolicholatirus
 †Dolicholatirus torquatus
 †Drepanocheilus
 †Drepanocheilus texanus
 †Drilluta
 †Drilluta buboanus
 †Drilluta lemniscata
 †Drilluta major – or unidentified comparable form
 †Dysnoetopora – tentative report
 †Dysnoetopora celleporoides

E

 †Ecphora
 Edaphodon
 †Edaphodon barberi – type locality for species
 †Edaphodon mirificus
 †Ellipsoscapha
 †Ellipsoscapha mortoni
  †Enchodus
 †Enchodus petrosus
 †Enchodus saevus – or unidentified comparable form
 †Endoptygma
 †Endoptygma leprosa
 †Eoacteon
 †Eocypraea
 †Eocypraea mortoni – type locality for species
 †Eocytheropteron
 †Eocytheropteron mutafoveata – type locality for species
 Eonavicula
 †Eonavicula newspecies1
  †Eotrachodon – type locality for genus
 †Eotrachodon orientalis – type locality for species
 †Epitonium
 †Epitonium sillimani
 †Etea
 †Etea carolinensis
 †Eubaculites
 †Eubaculites carinatus
 †Eufistulana
 †Eufistulana ripleyana
 †Eufistulina
 †Eufistulina ripleyana
 †Eulima
 †Eulima gracilistylis
 †Eulima monmouthensis
 †Euspira
 †Euspira rectilabrum
  †Eutrephoceras
 †Eutrephoceras dekayi
  †Exogyra
 †Exogyra costata
 †Exogyra ponderosa
 †Exogyra upatoiensis

F

 †Fissocarinocythere
 †Fissocarinocythere gapensis
 †Flemingostea
 †Flemingostea subspatulata
 †Flemingostrea
 †Flemingostrea cretacea
 †Flemingostrea subspatula
 †Fulgerca
 †Fulgerca attenuata – or unidentified related form
 †Fusimilis
 †Fusimilis monmouthensis
  Fusinus
 †Fusinus macnairyensis – or unidentified related form

G

 †Gegania
  Gemmula
 †Gemmula cretacea
  †Gervillia
 †Gervilliopsis
 †Gervilliopsis ensiformis
   †Globidens – type locality for genus
 †Globidens alabamensis – type locality for species
 Glossus
  Glycymeris
 †Glycymeris hamula
 †Glycymeris rotundata
 †Glycymeris subaustralis
 †Glyptoxoceras
 †Goniocylichna
 †Goniocylichna elongata
 †Graciliala
 †Graciliala decemlirata
 †Granocardium
 †Granocardium alabam
 †Granocardium alabamense
 †Granocardium bowenae – or unidentified comparable form
 †Granocardium deltanum
 †Granocardium kuemmeli
 †Granocardium kummeli
 †Granocardium lowei
 †Granocardium tholi
 †Granocardium tippananum
 †Granocardium tippanum
 †Graphidula
 †Graphidula multicostata – or unidentified related form
 †Graphidula terebriformis
 †Gryphaeostrea
 †Gryphaeostrea vomer
 Gyrodes
 †Gyrodes abyssinus
 †Gyrodes americanus
 †Gyrodes petrosus
 †Gyrodes spillmani
 †Gyrodes supraplicatus
 †Gyropleura
 †Gyrostrea
 †Gyrostrea cortex

H

 †Hadrodus
 †Hadrodus priscus
 †Halimornis – type locality for genus
 †Halimornis thompsoni – type locality for species
  †Halisaurus
 †Halisaurus sternbergi
 †Hamulus
 †Hamulus huntensis – tentative report
 †Hamulus onyx
 †Hamulus squamosus
 Haplocytheridea
 †Haplocytheridea eutawensis
 †Haplocytheridea renfroensis
 †Harduinia
 †Harduinia aequorea
 †Harduinia bassleri
 †Harduinia mcglameryae – type locality for species
 †Harduinia micrococcus
 †Harduinia mortonis
 Haustator
 †Haustator bilira
 †Helicaulax
 †Helicaulax formosa
 †Helicoceras
 Hemiaster
 †Hemiaster arcolensis – type locality for species
 †Hemiaster wetherbyi
 †Hercorhynchus
 †Hercorhynchus quadriliratus
 †Hercorhynchus trililatus
 †Hercorhyncus
 †Hercorhyncus tippanus
 †Heteromorpha
 †Heteromorpha ammonite
 Hippoporina – tentative report
  Hoplopteryx – tentative report
 †Hoploscaphies – tentative report
  †Hybodus
 †Hydrotribulus – tentative report
 †Hypolophus

I

 †Icanotia – tentative report
  †Ichthyodectes
 †Ichthyodectes ctenodon – or unidentified comparable form
  †Ichthyornis – type locality for genus 
 †Ichthyornis dispar – type locality for species
 †Inoceramus
 †Inoceramus sp A – informal
 †Inoceramus sp B – informal
 †Ischyrhiza
 †Ischyrhiza mira
 Isognomon
 †Isognomon carolinensis

J

 Juliacorbula
 †Juliacorbula monmouthensis

K

 †Kummelia

L

 Laternula
 †Laternula robusta
 †Latiala
 †Latiala lobata
 †Laxispira
 †Laxispira monilifera
 †Legumen
 †Legumen carolinense – or unidentified related form
 †Legumen ellipticum
 †Leptosolen
 †Leptosolen biplicata
 †Leptosolen bipticatus
 Lima
 †Lima deatsvillensis
 †Lima geronimoensis
 †Lima pelagica
 Limatula
 †Limatula acutilineata
 Limopsis
 †Limopsis meeki
 †Limopsis perbrevis
 †Linearia
 †Linearia crebelli
 †Linearia weiseri
 †Linearis
 †Linearis magnoliensis
 †Linearis metastriata
 †Linearis pectinis
 †Linter
 †Linter acutata
 †Linthia
 †Linthia variabilis
 †Liopeplum
 †Liopeplum canalis
 †Liopeplum cretaceum
 †Liopeplum rugosum
 †Liopistha
 †Liopistha protexta
 †Liothyris
 †Liothyris carolinensis – or unidentified comparable form
  Lithophaga
 †Lithophaga borealis – or unidentified comparable form
 †Longitubus
 †Longoconcha
 †Longoconcha dalli – tentative report
  Lopha
 †Lopha falcata
 †Lopha mesenterica
 †Lopha ucheensis
 †Lophochelys
 †Lophochelys venatrix – type locality for species
  †Lophorhothon – type locality for genus 
 †Lophorhothon atopus – type locality for species
 †Lowenstamia
 †Lowenstamia cucullata
 †Lowenstamia subplanas
 †Loxotoma
 †Lucina
 †Lupira
 †Lycettia
 †Lycettia tippana
 †Lycettia tippanus
 †Lyriochlamys
 †Lyriochlamys cretosus

M

 Malletia
 †Malletia littlei
 †Malletia longfrons
 †Malletia longifrons
 †Malletia stephensoni
 †Margaritella
 †Margaritella pumila
 Martesia
 †Mataxa
 †Mathilda
 †Mathilda cedarensis – or unidentified comparable form
 †Mathilda ripleyana – or unidentified related form
 †Medionapus
  †Megalocoelacanthus – type locality for genus
 †Megalocoelacanthus dobiei – type locality for species
 Menippe
 †Mesostoma
 †Micrabacia
 †Micrabacia cribaria
 †Micrabacia marylandica
   †Modiolus
 †Modiolus sedesclaris
 †Modiolus sedesclarus
 †Modiolus trigonus
 †Moorevillia – type locality for genus
 †Moorevillia hardi – type locality for species
 †Morea
 †Morea rotunda – or unidentified comparable form
 †Morea transenna
 †Myobarbum
 †Myobarbum laevigatum
 Myrtea
 †Myrtea stephensoni

N

 †Napulus
 †Napulus octoliratus
 †Neithea
 †Neithea bexarensis
 †Neithea quinquecostata
 †Neithea quinquecostatus
 †Nemocardium
 †Nemocardium fragile
 †Nemodon
 †Nemodon eufalensis
 †Nemodon eufaulensis
 †Nemodon grandis
 †Nemodon martindalensis
 †Nemodon stantoni
 †Nonactaeonina
 Nozeba
   Nucula
 †Nucula camia
 †Nucula cuneifrons
 †Nucula percrassa
 †Nucula severnensis
 Nuculana
 †Nuculana corbetensis
 †Nuculana longifrons
 †Nuculana rostratruncata
 †Nuculana whitfieldi
 †Nymphalucina
 †Nymphalucina linearia

O

  Odontaspis
 †Opertochasma
 †Ornatoporta – tentative report
 †Ornatoporta marylandica
 †Ornopsis
 Ostrea
 †Ostrea ucheensis

P

 †Pachydiscus
 †Pachymelania – tentative report
  †Pachyrhizodus
 †Pachyrhizodus caninus
 †Pachyrhizodus kingi
 †Pachyrhizodus minimus
 Pagurus
 †Pagurus convexus – type locality for species
 †Paladmete
 †Paladmete cancellaria
 †Paladmete gardnerae
 †Paladmete laevis
 †Palelops
 †Palelops eutawensis
 †Paleopsephaea – tentative report
 Panopea
 †Panopea monmouthensis
 †Parafusus
 †Paranomia
 †Paranomia scabra
 †Parmicorbula
 †Parmicorbula percompressa
 †Parmicorbula suffalciata
 †Parmicorbula terramaria
 †Pecten
 †Pecten venustus
 †Periplomya
 †Perrisonota
 †Perrisonota gabbi
 †Perrisonota littlei
 †Perrisonota protexta
 †Phacodus
 †Phacodus punctatus
 Phacoides
 †Phacoides mattiformis – tentative report
 †Phelopteria
 †Phelopteria linguiformis
 Pholadomya
 †Pholadomya occidentalis
 †Pholadomya tippana
 †Piestochilus
 †Pinna
 †Pinna laqueata
 †Placenticeras 
 †Placenticeras benningi
 †Plagiostoma
 †Plagiostoma woodsi – tentative report
   †Platecarpus
 †Pleuriocardia
 †Pleuriocardia eufaulense
 †Pleuronea
 †Pleuronea alveolata
 Plicatula
 †Plicatula mullicaensis
 †Plicatula tetrica
 Polinices
 †Polinices kummeli
  †Polycotylus 
 †Polycotylus latipinnis
 †Postligata
 †Postligata wordeni
 †Praeleda
 †Praeleda compar
 †Prionochelys
 †Prionochelys matutina – type locality for species
   †Prognathodon
 †Promathildia
 †Promathildia parvula – or unidentified comparable form
 †Propenser
 †Propenser hewletti
 †Protocardia
 †Protocardia spillmani
    †Protosphyraena
 †Protosphyraena nitida – tentative report
  †Protostega 
 †Protostega dixie – type locality for species
 †Protostega gigas
  †Pseudocorax
 †Pseudocorax affinis
 †Pseudocorax laevis
 †Pseudolimea
 †Pseudolimea reticulata
 †Pseudolimea sellardsi
 Pseudomalaxis
 †Pseudomalaxis pateriformis
 †Pseudomalaxis pilsbryi
 †Pseudomalaxis stantoni
 †Pseudomaura
 †Pseudoptera
 †Pseudoptera securiformis
 †Pseudoschloenbachia
 †Pseudoschloenbachia mexicana
 †Pseudualimea – tentative report
 †Pseudualimea reticulata
 †Pteria
 †Pteria rhombica
 †Pterocerella
 †Pterocerella tippana
 †Pterotrigonia
 †Pterotrigonia angulicostata
 †Pterotrigonia cerulea
 †Pterotrigonia eufalensis
 †Pterotrigonia eufaulensis
 †Pterotrigonia thoracica
  †Ptychodus
 †Ptychodus mortoni
 †Ptychodus polygyrus
 †Ptychosyca
 †Ptychosyca inornata
 †Ptychotrygon
 †Pugnellus
 †Pugnellus densatus
 †Pugnellus goldmani
 Pycnodonte
 †Pycnodonte belli
 †Pycnodonte mutabilis
 †Pycnodonte vesicularis
 †Pycnodonte wratheri
 †Pyncodonte
 †Pyncodonte mutabilis
 †Pyrifus
 †Pyrifusus
 †Pyropsis
 †Pyropsis perlata

Q

 †Quadrum
 †Quadrum gartneri

R

 †Rachiosoma
 †Rachiosoma mortoni
 †Radiopecten
 †Radiopecten mississippiensis
 †Rastellum
 †Rastellum aguilerae
 †Rastellum falcata
 †Rastellum mesenterica
 †Remera
 †Remera flexicostata
 †Remnita
 †Rhombopsis
  Ringicula
 †Ringicula clarki
 †Ringicula pulchella
  Rissoina
 †Rissoina tennesseensis
 Rostellaria – tentative report

S

 †Sargana
 †Sargana stantoni
 †Saurocephalus
 †Saurocephalus lanciformis – or unidentified comparable form
  †Saurodon
 †Saurodon leanus
  †Saurornitholestes – or unidentified comparable form
 †Scambula
 †Scambula perplana
  †Scapanorhynchus
 †Scapanorhynchus rapax
 †Scapanorhynchus rhaphiodon
 †Scaphites
 †Schizobasis
 †Scobinidola
 †Scobinidola guttatus
  †Selmasaurus – type locality for genus 
 †Selmasaurus russelli – type locality for species
 Serpula
 †Serpula adnata – tentative report
 †Serpula cretacea
 †Serpulus
 Solemya
 †Solenoceras
 †Solida
 †Solyma
 †Solyma elliptica – or unidentified related form
 †Sourimis
 †Sourimis georgiana – tentative report
  †Sphenodiscus
 †Sphenodiscus lobatus
 †Sphenodiscus pleurisepta
 †Spirorbula
 Spondylus
 †Spondylus gregalis
  Squalicorax
 †Squalicorax falcatus
 †Squalicorax pristodontus
 †Stantonella
 †Stantonella interrupta
 †Stenocyathus
 †Stenocyathus alabamiensis – type locality for species
 †Stenzeloceras – type locality for genus
 †Stenzeloceras sinuosum – type locality for species
 †Stephanophyllia
 †Stephanophyllia cribraria
  †Stratodus
 †Stratodus apicalis
 Striarca
 †Striarca cuneata
 †Striarca prebrevis
 †Striarca saffordi
 †Striaticostatum
 †Striaticostatum asperum
 †Striaticostatum sparsum
 Sulcoretusa
 †Syncyclonema
 †Syncyclonema kingi
 †Syncyclonema simplicius

T

 Teinostoma
 Tellina
 †Tellina marcosensis
 †Tellina munda
 †Tellinimera
 †Tellinimera buboana
 †Tellinimera gabbi
 †Tenea
 †Tenea parilis
 †Tenuipteria
 †Tenuipteria argentea
 †Tenuipteria argenteus
 Terebratulina
 †Terebratulina floridana
 Teredo
  †Thalassinoides
 †Thinochelys
 †Thinochelys lapisossea – type locality for species
 †Thylacus
 †Thylacus cretacea
 †Thylacus cretaceus
 †Tintorium
 †Titanosarcolites
  †Toxochelys
 †Toxochelys moorevillensis – type locality for species
 †Trachybaculites
 †Trachybaculites columna
  Trachycardium
 †Trachycardium efaulense
 †Trachycardium eufaulense
 †Trachycardium eufaulensis
 †Trigonarca
 †Trigonarca inflata
 Trochocyathus – tentative report
 Turboella
 Turritella
 †Turritella bilira
 †Turritella chalybeatensis
 †Turritella forgemoli – or unidentified comparable form
 †Turritella hilgardi
 †Turritella paravertebroides
 †Turritella tippana
 †Turritella trilira
 †Turritella vertebroides
   †Tylosaurus
 †Tylosaurus zangerli

U

 †Uddenia
 †Unicardium
 †Unicardium concentricum
 †Urceolabrum
 †Urceolabrum tuberculatum

V

 †Veniella
 †Veniella conradi
 †Vetericardiella
 †Vetericardiella crenalirata
 †Vetericardiella webbervillensis
 †Volutomorpha
 †Volutomorpha aspera
 †Volutomorpha mutabilis – or unidentified related form

W

 †Weeksia
 †Weeksia amplificata
 †Weeksia deplanata

X

 Xenophora
  †Xiphactinus
 †Xiphactinus audax

References
 

Alabama
Mesozoic